Raum the Old (Old Norse: Raumr inn gamli) is a legendary king in Norway in the Hversu Noregr byggdist and in Thorsteins saga Víkingssonar. He was said to have been ugly, as was his daughter, Bryngerd, who was married to King Álf. Indeed, in Old Norse, raumr means a big and ugly person.

In Hversu Noregr byggdist

Raum and his sons
In Heversu Noregr byggdist, Raum is one of the three sons of Nór, the legendary first king of Norway, and succeeds his father as a ruler and ancestor of rulers over southwestern Norway.

Raum attended a Yule feast given by Bergfin (Bergfinn) son of Thrym (Þrymr) the Giant of Vermland and bedded Bergfin's sister Bergdís (Bergdísr). Bergdís subsequently bore three sons: Björn (Bjǫrn 'bear'), Brand (Brandr 'sword'), and Álf (Álfr 'elf'). Álf was fostered by Bergfin himself and so became known as Finnálf (Finnálfr). Björn was kept by his mother and his name was expanded to  Jötunbjörn (Jǫtunbjǫrn 'Giant-bear'). Brand was sent to his father Raum who dedicated him to the gods (whatever that means exactly), and so he was afterwards known as Gudbrand (Guðbrandr 'God-sword').

Later Raum married Hild the daughter of Gudröd the Old (Guðrǫðr inn gamli) the son of King Sölvi (Sǫlvi) who first ruled the land now called Sóleyjar (the modern region of Solør comprising the municipalities of Grue, Åsnes, and Våler).

However the Ynglinga saga says that Sölvi the Old who first cleared Sóleyar lived much later, making this Sölvi to be the father of a second Sölvi, the father of Halfdan Goldtooth (Hálfdanr Gulltanni), the father of Sólveig or Sölva who married Ólaf Woodcutter (Ólafr Trételgja). But Af Upplendinga Konungum claims that Olaf's wife Sölva was the sister of King Sölvi the Old.

By his wife Hild, Raum became father of four legitimate sons: Gudröd, Hauk (Haukr) or Höd (Hǫðr), Hadding (Haddingr), and Hring (Hringr).

Descendants of Raum

Descendants of Gudbrand
Gudbrand inherited the valley Gudbrandsdal from his father Raum. King Gudbrand was father of King Audleif (Auðleifr), father of King Gudmund (Guðmundr), father of Gudbrand who rejected the title of king but called himself Jarl instead, and yet was the most powerful Jarl in the northern lands. Jarl Gudbrand's son was Jarl Geirmund (Geirmundr), father of Jarl Hródgeir (Hróðgeirr), father of Gudbrand who rejected the title of Jarl and called himself hersir 'lord' as did his descendants.

Descendants of Jötunbjörn
Jötunbjörn the Old inherited Raumaranes Dale from his father King Raum. (Raums Dale is the modern district of Romerike in the county of Akershus. Jötunbjörn was father of King Raum, father of Hrossbjörn (Hrossbjǫrn), father of Orm Broken-shell (Ormr Skjelamoli), father of Knatti who had two sons: Thórolf (Þórolfr) and Ketil Raum (Ketill Raumr). A variant of this genealogy appears at the beginning of the Vatnsdæla saga in which Ketil the Large is the direct son of Orm Broken-shell with no mention of either Knatti or of Ketil's brother Thórolf. Also nothing is said of Jötunbjörn's ancestry, only that he was from the north of Norway.
The Hversu then relates that Thórolf was father of Helgi, the father of Bersi, the father of Thormód (Þormóðr), the father of Thórlaug (Þórlaugr) who was the mother of Tungu-Odd (Tungu-Oddr). In the Landnámabók (1:15) it is said that two brothers whose ancestry is not given settled the Akraness in Iceland between Kalman's river (Kalmansár) and Char river (Aurridaár). One was Thormod who settled the land to the south of Reymir, and dwelt at Holm; he was the father of Bersi and Geirlaug, the mother of Tungu-Odd (Tungu-Oddr). The other was named Ketil. Further information appears in the Landnámabók (1.20). Tungu-Odd is a major character in Hænsna-Thóris saga (Hen-Thórir's saga). Geirlaug rather than Thorlaug is the name of Tungu-Odd's mother in all accounts except for that of the Hversu.

Descendants of Finnálf the Old
According to the Hversu, Finnalf inherited the land of East Dale (Eystri-Dal, probably the modern Dal) and all the land north of Lake Vænir (modern Lake Vänern) from the Gaut Elf river (the modern Göta älv river) north to the Raum Elf river (the modern Glomma river), and that the land was then called Álfheim.

Finnálf married Svanhild (Svanhildr) who was called Gold-feather (Gullfjǫðr) and was the daughter of Day (Dagr) son of Dayspring (Dellingr) by Sun (Sól) daughter of Mundilfari. Dag as a personification of day and the sun-goddess Sól are mentioned elsewhere, but only the Hversu mentions their daughter. Svanhild bore Finnálf a son named Svan the Red (Svanr inn rauðr) who was father of Sæfari, father of Úlf (Úlfr), father of Álf, father of Ingimund (Ingimundr) and Eystein (Eysteinn).

According to the eddic poem Hyndluljód (stanza 12), Óttar, whose genealogy is the subject of this poem, was son of Innstein (Innsteinn), son of Álf the Old, son of Úlf, son of Sæfari, son of Svan the Red. So the Innstein of the Hyndluljód and Eystein of the Hversu are presumably identical.

Descendants of Gudröd
Gudröd, Raum's eldest legitimate son, inherited the largest portion of his father's lands. Gudröd's son was Eystein the Wicked (Eysteinn illráði) who conquered part of Trondheim and set his son Önund over it. When Önund was killed in a revolt, Eystein made his dog, Saur, king of the territory. The tale is also told more fully as a deed of long ago in the Saga of Hakon the Good in the Heimskringla where Eystein (no parentage given) is said to be King of the Uplands in Norway, part of the modern county of Oppland. See Snær for another use of the dog king motif.

Descendants of Höd
Höd ruled over Hadeland (Haðaland). Höd was father of Höddbrodd (Hǫdbroddr). (The name Höd is identical to that born by the slayer of the god Baldr in other tales. And while the Höd of the Hversu is said to be father of a son named Höddbrodd, in Saxo Grammaticus' Gesta Danorum (Book 3)  Høtherus, the slayer of Balderus, is the son of Hothbrodus or Hothbroddus.) 

The Hversu relates that Höddbrodd son of Höd was the father of Hrólf (Hrólf), father of Hrómund Beserk (Hrómundr beserkr), father of three children: Hámund (Hámundr), Haki, and Gunnlöd (Gunnlǫðr).

Hámund was Earl of Hordaland and father of Hrók the Black (Hrókr inn svartr) and Hrók the White (Hrókr inn hvítr). Haki was father of Hródgeir (Hróðgeirr), father of Haki Beserk. Gunnlöd was the mother of Ústein (Ústeinn) and Innstein (Innsteinn). In Hálfs saga ok Hálfsrekka ('The saga of Hálf and his heroes'), the two brothers named Hrók and the brothers Útstein (Útstein) and Instein play prominent roles. This saga names the father of Útstein (Útstein) and Instein as a Jarl named Álf the Old of Hordaland, which is one of Hálf's kingdoms.

Hrók the Black was the father of Gunnlöd (Gunnlǫðr) the mother of Hrómund Grip's son, the protagonist of Hrómundar saga Gripssonar ('Saga of Hrómund Grip's son'). Two sons of Hrómund named Björnólf (Bjǫrnólfr) and Hróald (Hróaldr) appear among the first Norse settlers in Iceland in the Landnámabók (1.3) and are mentioned in other sagas.

Descendants of Hadding
The Hversu tells that Hadding son of Raum ruled over Haddingjadal and Telemark (Þelamörk). He was father of son also named Hadding, who himself was father of another Hadding, father of Högni the Red. The Hversu then comments cryptically that after him the three Haddings (Haddingjar) took power, that they ruled one after the other, and that Helgi Hadding-prince (Haddingjaskati) was one of them.

The Haddingjar are otherwise known as two of the sons of Arngrim of which the fullest account is in Hervarar saga and are certainly not the Haddingjar spoken of by the Hversu. (But some suspect all references to the Haddingjar are garblings of old traditions about the divine twins.) Helgi Haddingjaskati is mentioned in the prose epilogue to the eddic poem Helgavida Hundingsbana II which states that Helgi Hundingsbane and his Valkyrie and his lover Sigrún were afterwards reincarnated as Helgi Haddingjaskati and Kára as told in the Káraljód (Káraljóðr), a poem no longer extant. A version of this tale survives only in Hrómundar saga Gripssonar in which the Haldingjar are two concurrent kings of Sweden and Helgi is their champion. Helgi conquers in part through the magic of his lover, the sorceress Kára, who appears in the form of a swan. When Helgi accidentally kills her, he meets his own doom and the Halding kings flee. Haldingjar seems to a garblings of Haddingjar. The Hversu account probably indicates a version in which both Helgi and the two Haddingjar proper (probably here the sons of Högni the Red) were all three called Haddingjar and ruled in rotation. Also, in the text the name of Helgi's lover actually appears as Cára, which should have been normalized as Kára. But Cára was instead misread and transcribed as Lára in Jónsson and Vilhjálmsson's Fornaldarsögur Norðurlanda and so appears in most later discussion.

Descendants of Hring
Raum's son Hring was the eponym and ruler of Ringerike (Ringeríki) and also ruled Valdres (a valley of modern Oppland). Hring married the daughter of a sea-king named Vifil (Vifill) by whom he was the father of Halfdan the Old (Hálfdan gamli). See Halfdan the Old to follow this lineage further.

Alternative spellings
Alternative Anglicizations are: Álf: Alf ; Álfheim: Alfheim ; Bergdís: Bergdis ; Björn: Bjorn ; Björnólf: Bjornolf ; Finnálf: Finnalf ; Gudröd: Gudrod ; Gunnlöd: Gunnlod ; Hálf: Half ; Halfdan: Hálfdan ; Hámund: Hamund ; Hródgeir: Hrodgeir ; Hrossbjörn: Hrossbjorn ; Högni: Hogni ; Höd: Hod, Hodr, Hoder, Hother ; Höddbrodd: Hoddbrodd ; Hróald: Hroald ; Hrók the Black: Rook the Black ; Hrók the White: Rook the White ; Hrólf: Hrolf ; Hrómund: Hromund ; Jötunbjörn: Jotunbjorn ; Kára: Kara ; Ketil Raum: Ketil the Large ; Lára: Lara ; Ólaf: Olaf ; Önund: Onund ; Raumaríki: Raumarike, Raumarik, Raum's-ric ; Sæfari: Saefari ; Sigrún: Sigrun ; Sól: Sol ; Sóleyjar: Soleyjar ; Sölva: Solva ; Sólveig: Solveig ; Sölvi: Solvi ; Thórolf: Thorolf ; Thrym: Thrymr ; Úlf: Ulf ; Útstein: Utstein.

References

Norwegian petty kings
Kings in Norse mythology and legends